Elizabeth Compton, Countess of Northampton (19 August 1694 – 13 March 1741), suo jure 15th Baroness Ferrers of Chartley, was a British peer.

Elizabeth was the daughter of the Hon. Robert Shirley, eldest son of Robert Shirley, 1st Earl Ferrers. After the deaths of her father (in 1698) and her brother (in 1714), Elizabeth became her grandfather's heiress apparent. She married James Compton, Lord Compton in 1716; on her grandfather's death in 1717, she succeeded him as Baroness Ferrers of Chartley and became Countess of Northampton when her husband inherited the earldom in 1727.

She died in March 1741, aged 46, when her barony fell into abeyance between her daughters. However, the abeyance was terminated eight years later in favour of her daughter Charlotte. Lord Northampton died in 1754 and was succeeded in his junior title of Baron Compton by his daughter Charlotte. She was the wife of George Townshend, 4th Viscount Townshend, later first Marquess Townshend.

Notes

References
Kidd, Charles, Williamson, David (editors). Debrett's Peerage and Baronetage (1990 edition). New York: St Martin's Press, 1990,

External links 
 The Correspondence of Elizabeth Compton in EMLO

1694 births
1741 deaths
15
Ferrers of Chartley, Elizabeth Compton, 15th Baroness
Female heirs apparent
English countesses